The 2018 season was Viking's 1st year back in 1. divisjon, after 29 consecutive seasons in the top flight of Norwegian football.

Season events
On 18 December 2017, Bjarne Berntsen was appointed manager.

Squad

Transfers

Winter

In:

Out:

Summer

In:

Out:

Friendlies

Pre-season

Competitions

1. divisjon

Table

Results summary

Results by round

Matches

Norwegian Cup

Squad statistics

Appearances and goals

|-
|colspan="14"|Players who left Viking during the season:

|}

Goal scorers

Disciplinary record

References

Viking FK seasons
Viking